The Madeiran large white (Pieris brassicae wollastoni) is a subspecies of the large white butterfly, endemic to Madeira. It was described by the English entomologist, Arthur Gardiner Butler in 1886.

Description
It can reach a size of 55 to 65 millimetres. The wings are pure white with a wide black tip on the apexes of the forewings. Its natural habitat is the laurisilva laurel forest. 

Larvae have yellow stripes on the upper part of the green body and has black lumps. Known food plants are nasturtium (Tropaeolum majus) and cabbage (Brassica oleracea).

Decline
Considering that the butterfly was last collected in 1977, and not found since despite a 15-year survey during the 1980s and 1990s, it might be either extremely rare or possibly extinct. 

The disappearance of this species coincides with the introduction, in the 1950s, of the small white butterfly (Pieris rapae). The mechanisms involved are not fully understood but a viral infection may be involved with the small white introducing a different strain of the granulosis virus, for which the Madeiran large white had no resistance.  Another reason may be the introduction of a widely introduced agricultural bioagent, the wasp parasitoid, Cotesia glomerata, which was found in the western Canary Islands in May 2006. It uses the Pieridae as a host and is commonly found where Pieridae species are in abundance.

Distribution
Endemic to Madeira and found in the northern valleys of the laurel forest.

Etymology
The scientific name commemorates Thomas Vernon Wollaston, an English entomologist who has discovered several insect taxa on Madeira.

References

Further reading
Holt White, A.E. & Rashleigh (editors) (1894) The butterflies and moths of Teneriffe. Illustrated from the author's drawings. L. Reeve & Co., London

External links
Large White

Pieris (butterfly)
Butterflies of Africa
Arthropods of Madeira
Endemic fauna of Madeira
Butterfly subspecies
Taxa named by Arthur Gardiner Butler
Butterflies described in 1886
Taxonomy articles created by Polbot